Gustavo Abel Dezotti (born 14 February 1964) is an Argentine former footballer who played as a striker. He played most of his career for Newell's Old Boys in Argentina and was part of the team that won the Primera Division Argentina championship of 1987–1988.

Being part of a title winning side brought him to the attention of Major European clubs, and in 1988 he moved to Italy where he played for S.S. Lazio and then U.S. Cremonese. In 1994, he moved to Mexico to play for Club León and then Club Atlas. Dezotti's final club were Defensor Sporting Club of Uruguay where he retired in 1998.

The most notorious moment of his career came when he was sent off in the 1–0 1990 FIFA World Cup final defeat against West Germany.

Honours
Newell's Old Boys
 Primera División: 1987–88

U.S. Cremonese
 Anglo-Italian Cup: 1992–93

Argentina
 FIFA World Cup runner-up: 1990

References 
 
 
 Profile at Lega Calcio 

1964 births
Living people
Argentine footballers
Argentine expatriate footballers
Argentina youth international footballers
Argentina under-20 international footballers
Argentina international footballers
Sportspeople from Córdoba Province, Argentina
Argentine people of Italian descent
Association football forwards
Newell's Old Boys footballers
Defensor Sporting players
S.S. Lazio players
U.S. Cremonese players
Atlas F.C. footballers
Club León footballers
1990 FIFA World Cup players
Argentine Primera División players
Serie A players
Serie B players
Liga MX players
Uruguayan Primera División players
Expatriate footballers in Italy
Expatriate footballers in Mexico
Expatriate footballers in Uruguay
Argentine expatriate sportspeople in Italy
Argentine expatriate sportspeople in Mexico
Argentine expatriate sportspeople in Uruguay
Pan American Games bronze medalists for Argentina
Medalists at the 1987 Pan American Games
Footballers at the 1987 Pan American Games
Pan American Games medalists in football